Tears from Heaven is the fourth volume of the American comics series Love and Rockets by the Hernandez brothers, Gilbert and Jaime, and published in 1988.

The cover of the compilation is by Gilbert Hernandez, the back cover by Jaime. Gilbert and Jaime's brother, Mario Hernandez, does not participate to this book, except for one cover.

Contents 
These stories are dated 1983–1988.

Chronology
Previous album: Las Mujeres Perdidas <-> Next album: House of Raging Women.

Comics publications
American graphic novels
Fantagraphics titles